Maple Ridge Township is the name of some places in the U.S. state of Minnesota:
Maple Ridge Township, Beltrami County, Minnesota
Maple Ridge Township, Isanti County, Minnesota

Minnesota township disambiguation pages